The Nicolaus Copernicus Monument is an outdoor sculpture commemorating and depicting Nicolaus Copernicus, installed along Solidarity Drive outside Chicago's Adler Planetarium, in the U.S. state of Illinois. Bronislaw Koniuszy's replica of Bertel Thorvaldsen's original 1830 sculpture in Warsaw, Poland, was created, installed, and dedicated in 1973. Adler Planetarium erected the monument to mark the 500th anniversary of Copernicus' birth.

See also

 1973 in art
 Copernicus Foundation
 List of public art in Chicago

References

1973 establishments in Illinois
1973 sculptures
Cultural depictions of Nicolaus Copernicus
Monuments and memorials in Chicago
Outdoor sculptures in Chicago
Sculptures of men in Illinois
Statues in Chicago